Ignatz Heinrich Mühlwenzel (c. 1690 – 11 July 1766) was a Bohemian mathematician.

Life 
Ignatz Heinrich Mühlwenzel (referred to in Biographisches Lexikon des Kaiserthums Oesterreich as Heinrich Mühlwenzel) was a member of the Jesuit order and a professor of mathematics at the University of Prague. He was of minority German ethnics in western Czech border. He was a skilled optician who ground lenses for his own telescopes. Mühlwenzel is notable because his mathematical "descendants," which include Johann Radon, number more than 10,000.

In 1736 he published Fundamenta mathematica ex arithmetica, geometria et trigonometria.

References 

1690 births
1766 deaths
People from Cheb
German Bohemian people
18th-century German mathematicians
Telescope manufacturers
Jesuit scientists
Catholic clergy scientists
Academic staff of the University of Breslau